Ontse Ntesa (born 24 October 1989) is a Motswana international footballer who plays as a defender for Motswana club Uniao Flamengo Santos.

International career
He has won five caps for the Botswana national football team.

References

Living people
1989 births
Botswana footballers
People from Central District (Botswana)
Association football defenders
ECCO City Green players
Mochudi Centre Chiefs SC players
Uniao Flamengo Santos F.C. players
Botswana international footballers